William Ralph Cameron Gardiner (born 1 January 1941) is a former New Zealand cricket umpire. He stood in nine Test matches between 1974 and 1980 and one ODI game in 1976.

See also
 List of Test cricket umpires
 List of One Day International cricket umpires

References

1941 births
Living people
Sportspeople from Whangārei
New Zealand Test cricket umpires
New Zealand One Day International cricket umpires